Antonio Altan San Vito (died 1450) was a Roman Catholic prelate who served as Bishop of Urbino (1436–1450).

Biography
On 10 Feb 1436, Antonio Altan San Vito was appointed during the papacy of Pope Eugene IV as Bishop of Urbino.
He served as Bishop of Urbino until his death in 1450.

While bishop, he was the principal co-consecrator of Heinrich Wagernin, Titular Bishop of Sebaste in Cilicia and Auxiliary Bishop of Kammin (1436).

References

External links and additional sources
 (for Chronology of Bishops) 
 (for Chronology of Bishops) 

15th-century Italian Roman Catholic bishops
Bishops appointed by Pope Eugene IV
1450 deaths